The 2011–12 season was Feyenoord's 104th season of play, it was their 56th season in the Eredivisie and its 90th consecutive season in the highest Dutch football division. They ended their league campaign in second place, after winning ten of the last eleven games of the season. They reached the third round of the KNVB Cup. It was the first season with Ronald Koeman, who signed as manager of Feyenoord  after former manager Mario Been resigned on 13 July 2011 due to a lack of trust from the squad.

Competitions

Overall

Eredivisie

League table

Results summary

Results by round

Matches

KNVB Cup

Player details

References

Feyenoord seasons
Feyenoord